The Continence of Scipio, or The Clemency of Scipio, is an episode recounted by Livy of the Roman general Scipio Africanus during his campaign in Spain during the Second Punic War. He refused a generous ransom for a young female prisoner, returning her to her fiancé Allucius, who in return became a supporter of Rome.  In recognition of his magnanimous treatment of a prisoner, he was taken as one of the prime examples of mercy during warfare in classical times. Interest in the story revived in the Renaissance and the episode figured widely thereafter in both the literary and visual arts, as well as opera.

The classical story
The story related by Livy in his history of Rome was followed by all later writers, although it is recorded that the earlier historian Valerius Antias took a dissenting view. According to Livy's account of the siege of the Carthaginian colony of New Carthage, the Celtiberian prince Allucius was betrothed to a beautiful virgin who was taken prisoner by Scipio Africanus in 209 BC.  Despite having a reputation for womanizing, instead of the usual brutal treatment given to attractive female "barbarian" prisoners, Scipio summoned her parents and fiancé, who arrived with a ransom of treasure. Scipio refused this and returned her to them, asking only that they be friends to Rome.  When they offered the ransom as a present, he accepted it, only to return it immediately as a wedding gift from himself.  Allucius then brought over his tribe to support the Roman armies in gratitude.

Early modern treatments

Literature and opera
This episode was a popular motif for exemplary literature from that time on, growing to a peak of popularity during the 17th and 18th centuries. Prior to this period, it was given pride of place in the story of Scipio inserted into translations of Plutarch’s Lives that was written originally by the Dutchman Carolus Clusius in 1567. Among dramatic treatments of the story, one of the foremost was the Scipion of Jean Desmarets (1638), which was then adapted into Dutch by Jan Lemmers as Schipio in Karthago (1649) and also performed later as Schipio en Olinde. In England a verse drama on the episode, Scipio Africanus, was chiefly distinguished by being the work of a schoolboy, Charles Beckingham. It was acted and later printed in 1718. 

Operatic treatments were numerous, with several composers setting the same libretto. So, for example, Nicolo Minato's Scipione Africano was set, or served as the basis for adaptations, by Francesco Cavalli (1662); Carlo Ambrogio Lonati (1692); Francesco Bianchi (1787); and Gioacchino Albertini (1789). In addition, there was Johann Sigismund Kusser's German version, Der großmütige Scipio Africanus (1694). Giovanni Battista Boccabadati's prose drama Scipione (1693) served as the basis for Apostolo Zeno's Scipione nelle Spagne.  This was performed in 1710, with music possibly by Antonio Caldara, and was also set by Alessandro Scarlatti (1714), Tomaso Albinoni (1724), George Friederic Handel (1726), Carlo Arrigoni (1739), and  Leonardo Leo (1740). Johann Christian Bach's La Clemenza di Scipione (1778) was also based upon it.

Visual arts

There were numerous artistic depictions of the mercy and sexual restraint of Scipio although, as with the operas, they go now by a variety of titles. "The Continence of Scipio" is most common in English, although "The Clemency of Scipio" is also found. In other languages the terms magnanimity (großmütigheit) and generosity are alternatives. There is also sometimes a difficulty in identifying which scene is intended. The most common alternative example of military clemency descending from classical times was Alexander the Great's generous treatment of the family of the defeated Persian King Darius, best known from Veronese's painting in London. The scene of a victorious general seated at the centre of the composition with kneeling figures before him might portray either story without other clues to its interpretation.

Typically, Scipio sits on a throne on a raised dias, stretching out an arm in the direction of the Spanish party, with their treasure laid out in front of them. The "continence" shown by Scipio is both sexual and financial.   The story of Timoclea and Alexander the Great is rather different, but produces similar compositions of a woman brought before a magnanimous classical commander, which sometimes accompanied the Continence in a series, and is also capable of being confused with it. Bernard de Montfaucon paired the two stories as his "Examples of the clemency and continence of conquerors" in a book of 1724.

Tapestry series based on the exploits of Scipio, which would often portray this scene, was one contextual identifier; so was connection with the histories of Livy or the expanded Plutarch for which the numerous surviving prints were intended, or on which they were dependent. Another context was the work's association with marriage, since the wedding between Allucius and his bride followed immediately on her restoration to him. Apollonio di Giovanni di Tommaso's episodic depiction appeared as a painted panel on a 15th-century marriage chest. 

Pietro da Cortona’s mural in the Palazzo Pitti was intended for the marriage of Ferdinando II de' Medici, Grand Duke of Tuscany in 1637. In the case of the 1621 painting of the scene by Anthony van Dyck, which features prominently George Villiers, 1st Duke of Buckingham, together with his future bride, the artist's patron was also the sponsor of the marriage. Several other paintings from this time may have similar histories. The connection also extends to literary works, since it is known that Boccabadati's 1693 drama Scipione was written for performance during the celebration of the marriage between Francesco II d'Este, Duke of Modena and Margherita Maria Farnese.

Many paintings of Scipio's act of clemency were produced in Europe - over a hundred by Low Countries artists alone. Some artists made a speciality of the subject, returning to it more than once. Frans Francken the Younger painted eight versions, Sebastiano Ricci six versions, Simon de Vos and Gerbrand van den Eeckhout four each. Joseph-Marie Vien painted two versions, as did Peter Paul Rubens. In the case of the latter, both paintings were subsequently destroyed. Beside the historical record, a sketch of the 1620 version remains, as does a copy now in Lacock Abbey. There are also 16th century frescos by Gian Battista Zelotti at the Villa Emo, Fanzolo; the Villa Caldogno-Nordera, Caldogna; and elsewhere in Italy.

Paintings

Below are listed some paintings of the subject in museum collections:
The Continence of Scipio, Giovanni Bellini (after 1506), National Gallery of Art
The Continence of Scipio Africanus, Domenico Beccafumi (c.1525), Palazzo Manzi, Lucca
The Continence of Scipio, Lambert Lombard (1547), Musée des Beaux-Arts, Rennes
The Continence of Scipio, Nicolò dell'Abbate (1555), Louvre
The Continence of Scipio, Giulio Licinio (after 1566), National Gallery, London
The Continence of Scipio, Karel van Mander (painting on copper, possibly used on a cabinet door, 1600), Rijksmuseum, Amsterdam
The Continence of Scipio, Anthony van Dyck (1621), Christ Church, Oxford
The Continence of Scipio, Jan Steen (1629), Cummer Museum of Art and Gardens
The Continence of Scipio, Nicolas Poussin (1640), The Pushkin State Museum of Fine Arts, Moscow
The Continence of Scipio, Gerbrand van den Eeckhout (ca. 1653), Rijksmuseum, (ca. 1669), Toledo Museum of Art
The Clemency of Scipio,  Giulio Romano (1688), Louvre
The Continence of Scipio, Sebastiano Ricci (c.1700-04), Galleria Nazionale di Parma
The Continence of Scipio, Giovanni Antonio Pellegrini (c.1708-13), The Cleveland Museum of Art
The Continence of Scipio, François Lemoyne (1726), Museum of Fine Arts of Nancy
The Clemency of Scipio, Michele Rocca (1720), Louvre
The Continence of Scipio, Giambattista Pittoni (1733), Louvre
The Continence of Scipio, Pietro Francesco Guala (1750), Musée départemental de l'Oise, Beauvais
The Clemency of Scipio, Giovanni Domenico Tiepolo (1751), Städel
The Continence of Scipio, Pompeo Batoni (1771 or 1772), Hermitage Museum
The Continence of Scipio, David Allan, 1774, National Gallery of Scotland
The Continence of Scipio, Jean-Germain Drouais (1784), Musée des Beaux-Arts, Rennes
The Continence of Scipio, Joshua Reynolds (1789), Hermitage Museum
The Continence of Scipio, Paul Chenavard (1848), Museum of Fine Arts of Lyon

Notes

References
 Kunzle, David (ed.), “The Magnanimous Soldier: The Continence of Scipio Africanus” in From Criminal to Courtier: The Soldier in Netherlandish Art 1550–1672, 2002, BRILL, 9789004123694, pp. 507–71.

3rd-century BC people
Latin works about history
Operas
1555 paintings
1771 paintings
Iconography
Works about sexual abstinence
Second Punic War
History of Murcia (region)
Roman conquest of the Iberian Peninsula
Pre-Roman peoples of the Iberian Peninsula
Works about ancient Rome